Douglas Marjoribanks Fisher (20 September 1941 – 9 July 2000) was an English actor best known for playing Larry Simmonds in Man About the House (1973–1976), Sammy in the films The Stud (1978) and The Bitch (1979) and Jim Medhurst in London's Burning (1988–1993).

Early life
He graduated from St Edmund Hall, Oxford in 1966, with a degree in French and Russian.

Career 
He portrayed Larry Simmonds, the lovable rogue who occupied the attic apartment in the ITV sitcom Man About the House and played Sammy in the films The Stud (1978) and The Bitch (1979), opposite Joan Collins. He also appeared in All Our Saturdays, Yes Minister, Home to Roost, Sorry!, Haggard, Close to Home, Goodnight Sweetheart, The Upper Hand and Heartbeat.  His final role was a clergyman in the 1999 miniseries adaptation of Oliver Twist.

He also played the role of Jim Medhurst (Kevin Medhurst's father) In TV series London's Burning from 1988 until the character was killed off in series 6 in 1993.Fisher appeared as habitual criminal Stephen Grismal in the Jonathan Creek episode The Wrestler's Tomb, in 1997.

Personal life
Fisher had a relationship with actress Susan Penhaligon in the early 1980s.

Death
On 9 July 2000, Fisher died of a heart attack aged 58.

Selected television roles

References

External links 

1941 births
2000 deaths
20th-century English male actors
Alumni of St Edmund Hall, Oxford
English male stage actors
English male television actors